Heterostigmatina is a grouping of mites.

References

Trombidiformes